The 1913 Iowa State Cyclones football team represented Iowa State College of Agricultural and Mechanic Arts (later renamed Iowa State University) in the Missouri Valley Conference during the 1913 college football season. In their second and final season under head coach Homer C. Hubbard, the Cyclones compiled a 4–4 record (2–2 against conference opponents), finished in fourth place in the conference, and were outscored by opponents by a combined total of 119 to 112. Lynn Cowan was the team captain.

Between 1892 and 1913, the football team played on a field that later became the site of the university's Parks Library. The field was known as State Field; when the new field opened in 1915, it became known as "New State Field".

Schedule

References

Iowa State
Iowa State Cyclones football seasons
Iowa State Cyclones football